The New Zealand Bill of Rights Act 1990 (NZBORA) requires that the attorney-general report to the New Zealand Parliament on any bills that contain provisions that appear to be inconsistent with the Bill of Rights Act.

Parliament is not constrained by the Bill of Rights Act and is free to ignore an attorney-general's report and enact any legislation it sees fit. In fact, the attorney-general, who prepares the reports, is a Government minister and is bound by Cabinet collective responsibility to support the passage of all Government bills through the House of Representatives.

Criminal Procedure (Reform and Modernisation) Bill 
The Criminal Procedure (Reform and Modernisation) Bill is a Government bill introduced by Simon Power as minister of justice on 15 November 2010. Public submissions on the bill closed on 18 February 2011 and the Justice and Electoral Select Committee was due to report back by 14 July 2011.

Attorney-General Chris Finlayson prepared two reports outlining conflicts between this bill and the Bill of Rights. The main report addressed the majority of the bill and an additional report dealt specifically with a proposed amendment to the Bill of Rights Act.

Conflict with right to a jury trial 
In New Zealand, offences are classified by the length of the maximum sentence. Offences punishable by less than three months in prison are not required to have a jury trial, but offences punishable by more than three months in prison have the right to a jury trial. This right is enshrined in section 24(e) of the Bill of Rights.

The Criminal Procedure (Reform and Modernisation) Bill proposes to raise the threshold for access to a jury trial from offences with a maximum sentence of three months in prison to offences with a maximum sentence of three years in prison.

The bill includes a provision to amend the Bill of Rights Act to remove the right to a jury trial for this expanded class of offences. This conflict with the Bill of Rights Act is outlined in the Attorney-General's supplemental report on the bill.

Conflict with right to be present during a trial 
Attorney-General's report identifies the following breaches of the right to be present during a trial:

 If the defendant has a "reasonable excuse" for not attending and the prosecutor is ready to proceed, the trial may proceed without them.
 If the defendant does not have a reasonable excuse, the trial must proceed without them.
 The defendant may be removed from a trial if they cause enough of an interruption that it is "impractical to continue".

The report also highlights a further provision of the bill that involves hearings for offences that do not carry a prison term. In this situation the bill gives judges the discretion to continue the hearing if the defendant does not turn up. In his report, the Attorney-General, Chris Finlayson defends this provision by asserting that judges will exercise this discretion "in a manner that does not limit section 25(e) of the Bill of Rights Act".

Conflict with the right to not be retried for the same offence 
According to the report, the bill contains two provisions that are in conflict with the double jeopardy rule (section 26(2) of the Bill of Rights Act):

 If the offence has a penalty of 14 years imprisonment and the Court of Appeal finds that there is new and compelling evidence of their guilt, the court can order a new trial.
 If the person is acquitted of an offence punishable by imprisonment and later convicted of corrupting their trial they can be retried.

Conflict with the right to be presumed innocent until proven guilty 
The report identifies two places where the onus of proof is reversed by the bill:

 The bill makes an amendment to the Fisheries Act 1996. It relates to people on New Zealand vessels fishing in foreign jurisdictions and requires that they prove that they transported fish "in accordance with the laws of that jurisdiction".
 The bill requires pilots who disobey foreign air traffic controllers to prove that the safety of people on the aircraft would have been endangered if they complied.

Provisions said to be justified

Defendants required to identify issues at trial 
Under the bill, defendants are to be required to identify issues they intend to rely on in their case, e.g. the points in their charge that are in dispute and whether they propose to rely on expert evidence. Failure to do so could be interpreted as an indication of guilt.

Finlayson notes that this a "novel step" in New Zealand and identifies a tension between this provision several rights enshrined in the Bill of Right's act: the right to silence, the right to a presumption of innocence, the right not to be compelled to give evidence or incriminate oneself and the right to a fair trial.

Finlayson concludes that there are sufficient safeguards in place for this provision of the bill to be justified under the Bill of Rights.

Other reports since 2005

References

Human rights in New Zealand